Rie Beisenherz (8 September 1901 – 12 April 1992) was a Dutch swimmer. She competed in the women's 100 metre freestyle event at the 1920 Summer Olympics. She was the first woman to represent the Netherlands at the Olympics.

References

External links
 

1901 births
1992 deaths
Olympic swimmers of the Netherlands
Swimmers at the 1920 Summer Olympics
Swimmers from Amsterdam
Dutch female freestyle swimmers
20th-century Dutch women
20th-century Dutch people